Coolidge is a city in Pinal County, Arizona, United States. According to the 2020 census, the city's population is 13,218.

Coolidge is home of the Casa Grande Ruins National Monument. The monument was the first historic site to receive protected status by the United States Government in 1892. Coolidge is also home to both Central Arizona College and the Central Arizona Valley Institute of Technology.

History
The area containing what is now the City of Coolidge was occupied by the Hohokam, an indigenous ancient Sonoran Desert people who built a massive compound consisting many of caliche structures and remained in the area for over 1,000 years. The only remaining and preserved structure from this compound is the Casa Grande Ruins National Monument.

The modern history of the city is centered around agriculture, particularly cotton. Coolidge was founded in 1925 when R.J. Jones laid out an  site during the construction of the Coolidge Dam on the nearby Gila River, which was completed in 1930. Both the dam and the townsite were named for Calvin Coolidge, the 30th President of the United States. The dam made the sandy soil native to the area into very rich farmland, and soon vast expanses of desert were plowed and acres of cotton were planted. This is when the area's status as the hub of the Arizona cotton industry was solidified and led to the incorporation of Coolidge as a city in 1945.

Economy
Up until the 1950s, the city's economy was completely dependent on mining and cotton. It has since diversified to include manufacturing, regional trade, and services for agricultural producers and farm families.

In 2019, Nikola Motor Company purchased  in Coolidge and operates a factory for zero-emissions heavy trucks, with a production capacity of 2,500 trucks per year.

Geography

It contains no mountains and is almost entirely flat, lying in a fertile valley located just south of the Gila River. The Sacaton Mountains are visible to the west, and the Picacho Mountains are visible to the southeast.

Arizona State Route 87 and Arizona State Route 287 pass through the town, providing connections to the Phoenix metropolitan area, Casa Grande, and Eloy.

Climate
Coolidge features a hot desert climate (Köppen climate classification BWh), typical of the Sonoran Desert. Rain is infrequent, occurring 2–3 days per month usually following the passage of a cold front.

Summertime lows are usually above , with occasional periods of lows above . Coolidge is affected by the North American Monsoon, which brings brief heavy downpours and gusty winds in the second half of summer. Severe events can sometimes cause haboobs and flash flooding.

Demographics

As of the census of 2000, there were 7,786 people, 2,585 households, and 1,938 families residing in the city.

The racial makeup of the city was 57.9% White, 8.3% Black or African American, 5.6% Native American, 0.7% Asian, 0.1% Pacific Islander, 23.6% from other races, and 3.8% from two or more races. 39.2% of the population were Hispanic or Latino of any race.

There were 2,585 households, out of which 38.5% had children under age 18 living with them, 48.8% were married couples living together, 19.3% had a female householder with no husband present, and 25.0% were non-families. 20.8% of all households were made up of individuals, and 9.9% had someone living alone who was 65 years of age or older. The average household size was 3.00 and the average family size was 3.44.

In the city, the population was spread out, with 32.9% under age 18, 10.4% aged 18–24, 24.4% aged 25–44, 18.9% aged 45–64, and 13.4% who were aged 65 years or older. The median age was 31 years. For every 100 females, there were 93.2 males. For every 100 females age 18 and over, there were 88.1 males.

The median income for a household in the city was $29,049, and the median income for a family was $33,536. Males had a median income of $29,159 versus $21,472 for females. The per capita income for the city was $13,663. About 20.9% of families and 24.7% of the population were below the poverty line, including 30.9% of those under age 18 and 20.5% of those age 65 or over.

In 2010, Coolidge had a population of 11,825. The racial and ethnic composition of the population was 43.6% non-Hispanic white, 7.3% non-Hispanic black, 0.5% Hispanic blacks, 3.8% non-Hispanic Native American, 1.9% Hispanic or Latino Native American, 1.0% Asian, 0.1% Pacific Islander, 0.1% non-Hispanic from some other race, 5.0% from two or more races and 42.0% Hispanic or Latino.

Education
 Coolidge High School, a high school located in the central part of the city.
 West Elementary School, a K-6 school located in the western part of the city.
 Imagine Schools Coolidge Elementary, a K-5 charter school located in the northern part of the city.
 Imagine Prep Coolidge, a 6–12 charter school located adjacent to Imagine Coolidge Elementary.
 Central Arizona College
 Central Arizona Valley Institute of Technology

Transportation
The City of Coolidge operates the Cotton Express, which provides local bus service. The City of Coolidge also operates Central Arizona Regional Transit (CART), which provides transportation between Florence, Coolidge, Central Arizona College and Casa Grande.

The town was home to a station for Amtrak; it closed in June 1996.

The closest major airports to Coolidge are Phoenix Sky Harbor International Airport and Tucson International Airport. Casa Grande Shuttle provides an airport shuttle to Sky Harbor.

Notable people
 Duane Eddy – rock & roll guitarist and record producer, Coolidge High School graduate
 Waylon Jennings – singer, Country Music Hall of Fame
 Sammi Smith – country music recording artist and songwriter

Historic properties

See also
 Central Arizona College
 Central Arizona Valley Institute of Technology
 Coolidge Municipal Airport
 Coolidge Dam

References

External links

 
 
 
 

Cities in Arizona
Cities in Pinal County, Arizona
Populated places established in 1945
Phoenix metropolitan area